Gil Eun-hye (born ) is a South Korean actress. She appeared in the 2015 television drama series Orange Marmalade.

Filmography

Television

School 2013 (KBS2 / 2012-2013) - Gil Eun-hye (student)
Nail Shop Paris (MBC QueeN, 2013)
The Noblesse (JTBC, 2013–2014) – So-ra
Rosy Lovers (MBC / 2014-2015) - Joo-young
Orange Marmalade (KBS2 / 2015) - Jo A-ra
Temperature of Love (SBS / 2017) - Lee Hyun-yi
Coffee, Do Me a Favor (Channel A / 2018-2019) - Kang Ye-na
Angel's Last Mission (KBS2 / 2019) - Geum Ru Na

Film
Tell Me Something (1999) - Soo-yeon (young)
Roommates (2006)
Mother (2009)
Little Black Dress (2011) - assistant writer
Horror Stories 2 (2013)
There Is No Antidote (2013)

References

External links
 Gil Eun-hye at Jump Entertainment 
 

South Korean film actresses
South Korean television actresses
1988 births
Living people
Konkuk University alumni